The Sakhalin Constituency (No.167) is a Russian legislative constituency in the Sakhalin Oblast. The constituency is the only one in Sakhalin Oblast, and occupies the whole of its territory. It is also the only Russian constituency situated exclusively on islands.

Members elected

Election results

1993

|-
! colspan=2 style="background-color:#E9E9E9;text-align:left;vertical-align:top;" |Candidate
! style="background-color:#E9E9E9;text-align:left;vertical-align:top;" |Party
! style="background-color:#E9E9E9;text-align:right;" |Votes
! style="background-color:#E9E9E9;text-align:right;" |%
|-
|style="background-color: " |
|align=left|Boris Tretyak
|align=left|Independent
|55,041
|23.29%
|-
|style="background-color:#EA3C38" |
|align=left|Aleksandr Grishko
|align=left|Civic Union
| -
|20.90%
|-
| colspan="5" style="background-color:#E9E9E9;"|
|- style="font-weight:bold"
| colspan="3" style="text-align:left;" | Total
| 236,294
| 100%
|-
| colspan="5" style="background-color:#E9E9E9;"|
|- style="font-weight:bold"
| colspan="4" |Source:
|
|}

1995

|-
! colspan=2 style="background-color:#E9E9E9;text-align:left;vertical-align:top;" |Candidate
! style="background-color:#E9E9E9;text-align:left;vertical-align:top;" |Party
! style="background-color:#E9E9E9;text-align:right;" |Votes
! style="background-color:#E9E9E9;text-align:right;" |%
|-
|style="background-color: " |
|align=left|Ivan Zhdakayev
|align=left|Communist Party
|61,582
|23.42%
|-
|style="background-color: " |
|align=left|Boris Tretyak (incumbent)
|align=left|Independent
|55,031
|20.93%
|-
|style="background-color:#E98282" |
|align=left|Lyubov Shubina
|align=left|Women of Russia
|27,653
|10.52%
|-
|style="background-color: |
|align=left|Mikhail Romanovsky
|align=left|Political Movement of Transport Workers
|23,269
|8.85%
|-
|style="background-color: " |
|align=left|Nikolay Dolgikh
|align=left|Independent
|17,489
|6.65%
|-
|style="background-color: " |
|align=left|Mikhail Glazov
|align=left|Liberal Democratic Party
|17,229
|6.55%
|-
|style="background-color:#2C299A"|
|align=left|Sergey Ponomarev
|align=left|Congress of Russian Communities
|11,431
|4.35%
|-
|style="background-color:"|
|align=left|Yuri Stiplin
|align=left|Environmental Party of Russia "Kedr"
|8,337
|3.17%
|-
|style="background-color: " |
|align=left|Anatoly Zhilin
|align=left|Independent
|5,573
|2.12%
|-
|style="background-color: " |
|align=left|Valentin Chumakov
|align=left|Independent
|4,108
|1.56%
|-
|style="background-color:#5A5A58"|
|align=left|Tatyana Yatsmirskaya
|align=left|Federal Democratic Movement
|3,658
|1.39%
|-
|style="background-color:#000000"|
|colspan=2 |against all
|23,584
|8.97%
|-
| colspan="5" style="background-color:#E9E9E9;"|
|- style="font-weight:bold"
| colspan="3" style="text-align:left;" | Total
| 262,943
| 100%
|-
| colspan="5" style="background-color:#E9E9E9;"|
|- style="font-weight:bold"
| colspan="4" |Source:
|
|}

1999

|-
! colspan=2 style="background-color:#E9E9E9;text-align:left;vertical-align:top;" |Candidate
! style="background-color:#E9E9E9;text-align:left;vertical-align:top;" |Party
! style="background-color:#E9E9E9;text-align:right;" |Votes
! style="background-color:#E9E9E9;text-align:right;" |%
|-
|style="background-color: "|
|align=left|Ivan Zhdakayev (incumbent)
|align=left|Independent
|55,267
|24.43%
|-
|style="background-color: "|
|align=left|Boris Tretyak
|align=left|Independent
|46,475
|20.55%
|-
|style="background-color: "|
|align=left|Sergey Ponomarev
|align=left|Independent
|22,859
|10.11%
|-
|style="background-color: "|
|align=left|Viktor Dolgikh
|align=left|Independent
|13,224
|5.85%
|-
|style="background-color: "|
|align=left|Pavel Alborov
|align=left|Independent
|9,864
|4.36%
|-
|style="background-color: "|
|align=left|Valery Kulbakov
|align=left|Independent
|7,962
|3.52%
|-
|style="background-color: "|
|align=left|Valery Kukushkin
|align=left|Independent
|7,104
|3.14%
|-
|style="background-color:#C21022"|
|align=left|Sergey Sedov
|align=left|Party of Pensioners
|6,769
|2.99%
|-
|style="background-color:#23238E"|
|align=left|Vladislav Rukavets
|align=left|Our Home – Russia
|6,112
|2.70%
|-
|style="background-color: "|
|align=left|Nina Moskvina
|align=left|Independent
|5,780
|2.56%
|-
|style="background-color: "|
|align=left|Nina Gultyayeva
|align=left|Independent
|4,815
|2.13%
|-
|style="background-color: "|
|align=left|Larisa Moskvina-Yevgrashina
|align=left|Independent
|2,523
|1.12%
|-
|style="background-color:#000000"|
|colspan=2 |against all
|33,518
|14.82%
|-
| colspan="5" style="background-color:#E9E9E9;"|
|- style="font-weight:bold"
| colspan="3" style="text-align:left;" | Total
| 226,197
| 100%
|-
| colspan="5" style="background-color:#E9E9E9;"|
|- style="font-weight:bold"
| colspan="4" |Source:
|
|}

2003

|-
! colspan=2 style="background-color:#E9E9E9;text-align:left;vertical-align:top;" |Candidate
! style="background-color:#E9E9E9;text-align:left;vertical-align:top;" |Party
! style="background-color:#E9E9E9;text-align:right;" |Votes
! style="background-color:#E9E9E9;text-align:right;" |%
|-
|style="background-color: " |
|align=left|Ivan Zhdakayev (incumbent)
|align=left|Communist Party
|61,888
|28.12%
|-
|style="background-color: "|
|align=left|Vladimir Yefremov
|align=left|United Russia
|46,262
|21.02%
|-
|style="background-color: "|
|align=left|Sergey Podolyan
|align=left|Independent
|44,209
|20.09%
|-
|style="background-color:#1042A5"|
|align=left|Viktor Yefremov
|align=left|Union of Right Forces
|12,314
|5.60%
|-
|style="background-color: "|
|align=left|Olga Blinova
|align=left|Independent
|6,062
|2.75%
|-
|style="background-color: " |
|align=left|Andrey Polukhanov
|align=left|Liberal Democratic Party
|5,480
|2.49%
|-
|style="background-color:#164C8C"|
|align=left|Nadezhda Veter
|align=left|United Russian Party Rus'
|3,903
|1.77%
|-
|style="background-color: "|
|align=left|Irina Yanko
|align=left|Independent
|3,313
|1.51%
|-
|style="background-color: "|
|align=left|Oleg Lopatka
|align=left|Independent
|1,553
|0.71%
|-
|style="background-color:#7C73CC"|
|align=left|Valery Voytenkov
|align=left|Great Russia–Eurasian Union
|1,072
|0.49%
|-
|style="background-color:#000000"|
|colspan=2 |against all
|29,289
|13.31%
|-
| colspan="5" style="background-color:#E9E9E9;"|
|- style="font-weight:bold"
| colspan="3" style="text-align:left;" | Total
| 220,053
| 100%
|-
| colspan="5" style="background-color:#E9E9E9;"|
|- style="font-weight:bold"
| colspan="4" |Source:
|
|}

2006

|-
! colspan=2 style="background-color:#E9E9E9;text-align:left;vertical-align:top;" |Candidate
! style="background-color:#E9E9E9;text-align:left;vertical-align:top;" |Party
! style="background-color:#E9E9E9;text-align:right;" |Votes
! style="background-color:#E9E9E9;text-align:right;" |%
|-
|style="background-color: " |
|align=left|Svetlana Ivanova
|align=left|Communist Party
|42,049
|41.31%
|-
|style="background-color: "|
|align=left|Aleksandr Gusto
|align=left|United Russia
|31,512
|30.96%
|-
|style="background-color: "|
|align=left|Andrey Nagibin
|align=left|The Greens
|7,933
|7.79%
|-
|style="background-color: " |
|align=left|Andrey Polukhanov
|align=left|Liberal Democratic Party
|2,686
|2.63%
|-
|style="background-color: "|
|align=left|Vitaly Guliy
|align=left|Independent
|2,664
|2.61%
|-
|style="background-color: "|
|align=left|Aleksandr Kolodkin
|align=left|Independent
|1,396
|1.37%
|-
|style="background-color:#000000"|
|colspan=2 |against all
|11,378
|11.17%
|-
| colspan="5" style="background-color:#E9E9E9;"|
|- style="font-weight:bold"
| colspan="3" style="text-align:left;" | Total
| 101,780
| 100%
|-
| colspan="5" style="background-color:#E9E9E9;"|
|- style="font-weight:bold"
| colspan="4" |Source:
|
|}

2016

|-
! colspan=2 style="background-color:#E9E9E9;text-align:left;vertical-align:top;" |Candidate
! style="background-color:#E9E9E9;text-align:left;vertical-align:top;" |Party
! style="background-color:#E9E9E9;text-align:right;" |Votes
! style="background-color:#E9E9E9;text-align:right;" |%
|-
|style="background-color: " |
|align=left|Georgy Karlov
|align=left|United Russia
|60,280
|42.88%
|-
|style="background-color: " |
|align=left|Svetlana Ivanova
|align=left|Communist Party
|35,148
|25.00%
|-
|style="background-color: " |
|align=left|Dmitry Fleyer
|align=left|Liberal Democratic Party
|15,458
|11.00%
|-
|style="background: "|
|align=left|Aleksandr Zenkin
|align=left|Communists of Russia
|5,616
|3.99%
|-
|style="background-color: " |
|align=left|Eduard Taran
|align=left|A Just Russia
|5,550
|3.95%
|-
|style="background-color: " |
|align=left|Veniamin Pak
|align=left|Yabloko
|4,801
|3.41%
|-
|style="background-color: " |
|align=left|Aleksey Grigorenko
|align=left|Rodina
|4,722
|3.36%
|-
|style="background-color: " |
|align=left|Irina Repina
|align=left|Patriots of Russia
|2,838
|2.02%
|-
| colspan="5" style="background-color:#E9E9E9;"|
|- style="font-weight:bold"
| colspan="3" style="text-align:left;" | Total
| 140,586
| 100%
|-
| colspan="5" style="background-color:#E9E9E9;"|
|- style="font-weight:bold"
| colspan="4" |Source:
|
|}

2021

|-
! colspan=2 style="background-color:#E9E9E9;text-align:left;vertical-align:top;" |Candidate
! style="background-color:#E9E9E9;text-align:left;vertical-align:top;" |Party
! style="background-color:#E9E9E9;text-align:right;" |Votes
! style="background-color:#E9E9E9;text-align:right;" |%
|-
|style="background-color: " |
|align=left|Georgy Karlov (incumbent)
|align=left|United Russia
|56,558
|38.65%
|-
|style="background-color: " |
|align=left|Aleksey Kornienko
|align=left|Communist Party
|35,820
|24.48%
|-
|style="background-color: "|
|align=left|Roman Vedeneyev
|align=left|New People
|14,488
|9.90%
|-
|style="background-color: " |
|align=left|Dmitry Fleyer
|align=left|Liberal Democratic Party
|9,792
|6.69%
|-
|style="background-color: " |
|align=left|Aleksandr Anistratov
|align=left|A Just Russia — For Truth
|9,176
|6.27%
|-
|style="background-color: " |
|align=left|Oleg Koretsky
|align=left|Communists of Russia
|6,914
|4.72%
|-
|style="background-color: "|
|align=left|Aleksandr Konkov
|align=left|Rodina
|3,624
|2.48%
|-
|style="background-color: " |
|align=left|Anton Gurkin
|align=left|Yabloko
|3,130
|2.14%
|-
| colspan="5" style="background-color:#E9E9E9;"|
|- style="font-weight:bold"
| colspan="3" style="text-align:left;" | Total
| 146,345
| 100%
|-
| colspan="5" style="background-color:#E9E9E9;"|
|- style="font-weight:bold"
| colspan="4" |Source:
|
|}

Notes

Sources
167. Сахалинский одномандатный избирательный округ

References

Russian legislative constituencies
Politics of Sakhalin Oblast